Church station or Church Street station is a Muni Metro light rail station in San Francisco, California. It is located at the six-way intersection of Market Street, Church Street and 14th Street in the Duboce Triangle neighborhood. Service at the station began in June 1980.

Station layout 

The station consists of two side platforms next to the tracks on the second level down with the concourse mezzanine level overlooking it.

The J Church line, which enters and exits the Market Street subway tunnel in a portal near the station, connects to this station at two surface-level platform. The inbound stop is near the corner of Church and Market Streets, while the outbound stop is near the corner of Church and 14th Streets. The F Market & Wharves streetcar line, running along Market Street, also has stops at the intersection. The N Judah line also exits the Market Street tunnel before reaching the Church Street station and stops one block away at Church and Duboce Avenue.

At both Church Street station and Castro Street station, there is only one stairway on each side of Market Street leading into the station. (All other stations on the Market Street subway have entrances spread out along the length of the station.) One of these entrances is located on the northwest corner of Market and 14th Street, and the other is on the southwest corner of Market and Church Street.The street elevator is on the north side of Market Street west of 14th Street. Originally freestanding, it was incorporated in the façade of an apartment building constructed in 2017–2020.

As part of August 2020 changes to Muni Metro, the J became an all-surface line. The J terminates at the inbound platform on Church Street, providing an accessible transfer between the J and subway trains. A mini-high platform was to be constructed on the inbound platform at Church and Duboce, and an outbound mini-high platform was to be built on Church Street south of Market Street, allowing the J to be re-extended slightly to Duboce Street in October 2020.  The forced transfer at Church station – which requires J Church riders to cross two streets and use two elevators to transfer – was criticized by disability advocates.

However, on August 25, 2020 – just days after the changes – all Muni Metro service was again replaced by buses. J Church rail service resumed on December 19, 2020, with both new mini-high platforms in use and Duboce as the new terminus. The platforms were painted with a mural, Them (Ramp) by Simon Malvaez, in early 2021.

In 2022, new decorative railings were added on both Market Street boarding islands as part of the Upper Market Street Safety Project. They feature a quote from Harvey Milk's 1977 "You've Got to Have Hope" speech, as well as an illustration of streetcar #1051, which is dedicated in Milk's honor.

References

External links 

Muni Metro stations
Market Street (San Francisco)
Western Addition, San Francisco
Railway stations located underground in California
Railway stations in the United States opened in 1980